This is a list of television serial dramas released by TVB in 2020, including highest-rated television dramas and award ceremonies.

Top ten drama series in ratings
The following is a list of TVB's top serial dramas in 2020 by viewership ratings. The recorded ratings include premiere week, final week, finale episode, and the average overall count of live Hong Kong viewers (in millions).

Awards

First line-up
These dramas air in Hong Kong every Monday to Sunday from 8:00pm to 8:30pm on Jade.

Starting on 04 Jan 2020, these dramas air in Hong Kong every daily from 8:00pm to 8:30pm on Jade.

Second line-up
These dramas air in Hong Kong from 8:30pm to 9:30pm, Monday to Friday on Jade.

Remark: Starting on 14 Sept 2020 from 8:30 p.m to 10:30 p.m on Saturday, with two back-to-back episode until 06 Nov 2020 only on Jade.

Third line-up
These dramas air in Hong Kong from 9:30 pm to 10:30 pm, Monday to Friday on Jade. 

Remark: Starting on 21 Mar 2020 from 8:30 p.m to 10:30 p.m on Saturday, with two back-to-back episode until 18 Apr 2020 only on Jade.

Fourth line-up
These dramas air in Hong Kong from 10:30pm to 11:25pm, Monday to Friday on Jade.

Notes
Ratman To The Rescue 過街英雄; Released overseas on December 16, 2019. Copyright notice: 2019.
The Offliners 堅離地愛堅離地; Released overseas on November 18, 2019. Copyright notice: 2019.

Reference

External links
TVB.com Official Website 

2020
2020 in Hong Kong television